In the Polynesian mythology of Tonga, Laufakanaa (speak to silence; i.e.: command [the winds] to calm down) was a primordial creator god his home was Ata. 

In Tongan cosmogony, the sky and the sea, and the land of Pulotu (the dark underworld, the home of the souls of departed chiefs) existed from the earliest times. All other lands were created later. Either they were thrown down from the sky by Havea Hikuleo or, subsequently, they were fished up by Maui from the bottom of the ocean. All the makafonua (landstones) of Hikuleo were full of unevenness, and tended to jump around (that is, they were the source of earthquakes) and were full of holes and pits (that is, volcanoes), while Maui's lands were smooth (coral islands and atolls). ʻAta and ʻEua, the islands which were fished up first, were quite hilly, as Maui apparently was not an expert fisherman yet. His next catch, (Tongatapu) he kept much smoother.

The first people of Ata came forth directly from the same uanga (fly larva, maggot) as Kohai, Koau, mo Momo, and were the ancestors of all other men. At that time the god Tamapoulialamafoa was the king of the sky, and he commanded some of the Tangaloa gods to tell the faahikehe (sub-god) Laufakanaa to go down to the realm of light (i.e. the earth, not Pulotu) to become ruler of Ata and also ruler of the winds. Whenever a boat came to Ata in stormy weather, Laufakanaa had to listen to the prayers of the crew and give them a good wind to sail on. The prayer had to consist of an offering of mā (bread) cooked in the oil of the grated coconut.

Laufakanaa also brought a special fishing net with him. This typical Ata-net was used by the islanders on special occasions, as when they went fishing for the Tuʻi Tonga. As well, the putalinga (a kind of plantain), the sī (ti (plant)), the ngū-ata and tua-ata yams were brought down from the sky by Laufakanaa and first grew on Ata, before they spread to the other islands.

References
Traditions tonganiennes, legends collected by Father P. Reiter, originally published in the German/Swiss anthropology journal Anthropos, 1907
E.W. Gifford; Tongan myths and tales, BPB Bulletin 8; 1924

Tongan deities
Sky and weather gods